Sri Maharaja Rakai Pangkaja Dyah Wawa Sri Wijayalokanamottungga, better known in Indonesia as Dyah Wawa, was a ruler of the Mataram Kingdom in Central Java, Indonesia (r. 924–929). 

What is known of him is mainly thanks to an inscription engraved on the Minto Stone.

Wawa's son-in-law and successor, Mpu Sindok (r. 929–947), moved the court of Mataram from Central Java to East Java in 929. The latter could have buried the former at Belahan Temple near Pasuruan in East Java.

References

Further reading
Coedès, Georges, Les États hindouisés d'Indochine et d'Indonésie
Damais, Louis-Charles, "Études d'épigraphie indonésienne", Bulletin de l'École française d'Extrême-Orient, 1951, Vol. 45, No. 45-1, pp. 1–63
Jordaan, Roy E., "Bělahan and the division of Airlangga's realm", in Bijdragen tot de Taal-, Land- en Volkenkunde, 2008, pp. 326–355

History of Java
Javanese monarchs
10th-century Indonesian people